Trinidad is the principal island of Trinidad and Tobago.

Trinidad means Trinity in Spanish language.

Trinidad may also refer to:

Geography
 Trinity Island, Antarctica
 Trinidad, Bolivia, capital of the Beni department
 Trindade and Martim Vaz, an island of Brazil shown on some atlases as Trinidad
 Trinidad, Casanare, Colombia
 Trinidad, Colombia, in Guaviare Department, also known as Barranquilla
 Trinidad, Cuba, a city in Sancti Spíritus province, central Cuba
 La Trinidad Vista Hermosa, Oaxaca, Mexico
 Trinidad Zaachila, Oaxaca, Mexico
 Trinidad, Paraguay
 La Trinidad, Benguet, Philippines
 Trinidad, Bohol, Philippines
 Doña Remedios Trinidad, Bulacan, Philippines
 Trinidad, California, United States
 Trinidad, Colorado, United States
 Trinidad, Texas, United States
 Trinidad, Washington, D.C., United States
 Trinidad, Washington, United States
 Trinidad, Uruguay

People

Given name
 Trinidad Cardona (born 1999), American singer and songwriter
 Trinidad de Leon-Roxas (1899–1995), 5th First Lady of the Philippines
 Trinidad James (born 1987), Trinidad-born American rapper
 Trinidad Legarda (1899–1998), Filipina suffragist, clubwoman, philanthropist, and editor
 Trinidad María Enríquez (1846–1891), Peruvian teacher and student
 Trinidad Morales Vargas (born 1957), Mexican politician
 Trinidad Núñez Quiñones (born 1948), artisan, artist, researcher and teacher
 Trinidad Olga Ramos Sanguino (1918–2005), Spanish cupletista, violinist, and actress
 Trinidad "Trina" Padilla de Sanz (1894–1957), Puerto Rican, writer, poet, storyteller

Surname
 Diego Capel, a Spanish footballer
 Félix Trinidad, a Puerto Rican boxer
 Stanley Trinidad, fictional character
 Telesforo Trinidad, Filipino Medal of Honor recipient
 Thea Trinidad, American professional wrestler

Entertainment
 Trinidad (film), a 2008 documentary 
 Trinidad, a fictional character in Battle Angel Alita: Last Order
 "Trinidad", a song by Edguy on Rocket Ride
 Trinidad!, the first word of the Geographical Fugue by Ernst Toch

Transportation 
 The Trinidad (ship), the flagship of Magellan's voyage
 HMS Trinidad, three ships of the Royal Navy
 The Socata TB-20 Trinidad, a single-engine aircraft
 Trinidad station (disambiguation), stations of the name
 45634 Trinidad, a British LMS Jubilee Class locomotive

Other uses
Trinidad (given name), the history of the name.
Trinidad Energy Services, an oil and gas services company and trust
Trinidad (cigar brand), a Cuban cigar brand named after Trinidad, Cuba
Apache MyFaces Trinidad, an open-source library of JavaServer Faces components

See also
 Trindade (disambiguation)

Spanish unisex given names